Laura Miller is an American journalist and critic based in New York City. She is a co-founder of Salon.com.

Early life 
Miller was raised as a Catholic and grew up in California. She has since said she deplores the Church's "guilt-mongering and tedious rituals."

Career 

In 1995, Miller helped to co-found the news website Salon.com, and in 2000 she edited The Salon.com Reader's Guide to Contemporary Authors with Adam Begley.

In 2008 she authored The Magician's Book: A Skeptic's Adventures in Narnia, a book about C.S. Lewis's The Chronicles of Narnia fantasy series, her enchantment with it as a child, and her disenchantment with it as an adult after realizing its heavy use of religious themes. In 2016, Miller edited Literary Wonderlands, a literary encyclopedia chronicling the history of fiction.

She is Slate's Books and Culture columnist.

Reception 

Gary L. Tandy in Christianity and Literature called The Magician's book "Laura Miller's unique and intriguing extended essay about her experience as a lifelong reader of C. S. Lewis' The Chronicles of Narnia." He commented that the book is made interesting by the uneven course of her "love affair" with Lewis's writing; he notes that she admits she is not a Christian, despite her Catholic upbringing. She was therefore surprised to find that when as an adult she re-read the Narnia books, they had not lost their power, prompting her to write this book to explain why. In the book she both reflects on her own experience and interviews other authors and friends on the subject.

John D. Riley, writing in Against the Grain, described Literary Wonderlands as both "a checklist and guide to essential utopian, dystopian and speculative fiction that you have always been meaning to read" and "a valuable scholarly look back at familiar books and a fresh look forward to more adventurous reading in the future." The reviewer praised the attention to detail in the analyses of the various works, and found the way the book set the works in context was useful and interesting.

Bibliography

Books

Essays, reporting and other contributions

Notes

References 

Living people
American essayists
American literary critics
Women literary critics
American women essayists
American women journalists
Salon (website) people
The New York Times writers
The New Yorker people
Year of birth missing (living people)
21st-century American women
American women critics